The following highways are numbered 386:

Brazil
 BR-386

Canada
 Quebec Route 386

Japan
 Japan National Route 386

United States
  Arizona State Route 386
  Arkansas Highway 386
  Iowa Highway 386
  Montana Secondary Highway 386
  New York State Route 386
  Puerto Rico Highway 386
  South Carolina Highway 386 (former)
  Tennessee State Route 386
  Virginia Highway 386